Hinds may refer to:

Deer, especially does
Deer

People with the surname Hinds:
Hinds (surname)

In places:
Hinds, New Zealand, a small town
Hinds County, Mississippi, a US county
Hinds Lake, a lake in Minnesota
Hinds River, a river that flows through Hinds, New Zealand

In music:
Hinds (band), a band (originally named Deers) from Madrid, Spain

In business:
F. Hinds, a nationwide jewellery chain in the UK
Hinds, a brand of hand cream popular in Mexico and Argentina owned by GlaxoSmithKline of the UK

Other:
Hinds Community College, in Raymond, Mississippi, US
Hinds House, a historic building in Santa Cruz, California, US

See also
Hind (disambiguation)